Amaala is a land and property megaproject currently in development in Saudi Arabia that is managed by Red Sea Global and forms part of the Saudi Vision 2030 program. Its name is derived from the Arabic word for "hope", and focuses on luxury tourism to attract visitors to the Red Sea coast. The project consists of three main developments: The Coastal Development, Amaala Island, and Triple Bay.

The project is under the patronage of Prince Mohammed bin Salman. The Public Investment Fund (PIF) Development Management Organisation was established with Nicholas Naples, CEO. Amaala, along with the other Red Sea projects, is expected to provide jobs to 35,000 individuals. and planned to span over 3,800 km2.

On 25 October 2022, it was announced that AMAALA and The Red Sea Development Co. (TRSDC) has been merged to form Red Sea Global (RSG).

Phases 
The first phase of the project is planned to be completed by the fourth quarter of 2020. The project is to be wholly accomplished by 2028.

Facilities 
 2,500 hotel rooms
 200 retail shops, art exhibitions and marinas
 700 villas
 A state-of-the-art Marine Life Institute

Notes and references 
Notes

References

Public Investment Fund
Tourism in Saudi Arabia